Andrea Pansera (born December 28, 1979) is an Italian former professional football player who last played for Tritium Calcio 1908.

He played his only Serie A game on May 14, 2006, for Messina against Palermo when he came on as a substitute in the 80th minute for Nicholas Caglioni.
On 10 July 2009, as a free agent, he was signed by Lecco along with Marco Francini. At the end of the season the team got relegated and he decides to join Tritium.
The team finished as the winner of Group A of 2010–11 Lega Pro Seconda Divisione as well as 2011 Supercoppa di Lega di Seconda Divisione.
After being released by Tritium he was signed by Serie D club Darfo Boario.

References

External links

Italian footballers
Serie A players
U.C. AlbinoLeffe players
A.C.R. Messina players
U.S. Massese 1919 players
U.S. Sestese Calcio players
Calcio Lecco 1912 players
1979 births
Living people
Association football goalkeepers
A.C. Meda 1913 players